William Hebard (November 29, 1800October 20, 1875) was an American attorney and politician from Vermont.  He served in several elected offices, and was most notable for representing Vermont in the United States House of Representatives for two terms (1849-1853).

Born in Hebard Windham, Connecticut, Hebard was raised in Randolph, Vermont.  He taught school before attaining admission to the bar in 1827.  While practicing in Randolph, Hebard was active in politics and government as a Whig, and the offices he held included state's attorney, probate judge, member of the Vermont House and Senate, and associate justice of the state supreme court.  In 1845, Hebard moved to Chelsea, Vermont, where he continued to practice law.  He was elected to Congress in 1848, and served two terms, 1849 to 1853.  Hebard became a Republican when the party was founded in the 1850s, and represented Chelsea in the Vermont House several times in the 1850s, 1860s, and 1870s.  He was also a delegate to the state constitutional convention in 1857, and the 1860 Republican National Convention.

Hebard continued to practice law almost until his death.  He died in Chelsea, and was buried in Randolph Center's Old Cemetery.

Early life
Hebard was born in Windham, Connecticut, one of seven children born to Diah Hebard (1757-1841) and Zerviah Hebert (or Ebert) (d. 1850).  His parents moved to Randolph, Vermont when Hebard was a boy, and he was raised  on the family farm in West Randolph.  He attended the local schools of Randolph, and Randolph's Orange County Grammar School.  Hebard taught school while he studied law with attorney William Nutting of Randolph, was admitted to the bar in 1827, and commenced practice in East Randolph, Vermont.

Start of career
Hebard was long active in politics and government, and the offices he held while residing in Randolph included:

State's attorney of Orange County from 1832 to 1833, 1834 to 1835, and 1836 to 1837.
 Member of the Vermont House of Representatives from Randolph from 1835 to 1836, and 1840 to 1843.
 Member of the Vermont Senate from Orange County from 1836 to 1837, and 1838 to 1839.
 Judge of Probate for Orange County's Randolph district from 1838 to 1839, and 1840 to 1842.
 Associate Justice of the Vermont Supreme Court in 1842, and again in 1844.

U.S. Congressman
Hebard moved to Chelsea, Vermont in 1845.  In 1848, he was elected to the United States House of Representatives as a Whig, and he served two terms, March 4, 1849 to March 3, 1853.  In 1849, Hebard served on the state Council of Censors, the body which met every seven years to review actions of Vermont's government and ensure their constitutionality.  While he practiced in Chelsea, the students who learned under Hebard's tutelage in preparation for legal careers of their own included Jonathan Ross.

Later career
After leaving Congress, Hebard practiced law in partnership with Burnham Martin.  By now a Republican, he was a delegate to the 1857 state constitutional convention, and served in the Vermont House of Representatives from Chelsea from 1858 to 1860, 1864 to 1866, and 1872 to 1874.  He was also delegate to the 1860 Republican National Convention.

Death
Hebard died in Chelsea on October 20, 1875.  He was interred in Randolph Center's Old Cemetery.

Family
In 1830, Hebard married Elizabeth Starkwether Brown (d. 1880), a niece and adopted daughter of Olivia Brown Chase and Dudley Chase.  They were the parents of five children: Olivia (b. 1832), William (died at age seven), Salmon (1835-1894), George (1840-1879), and another son who was named William (b. 1845) following the death of his elder brother.

References

Sources

Books

Newspapers

Internet

External links
 

William Hebard at Govtrack US Congress

William Hebard at The Political Graveyard

1800 births
1875 deaths
People from Windham, Connecticut
People from Chelsea, Vermont
People from Randolph, Vermont
Vermont Republicans
Justices of the Vermont Supreme Court
Whig Party members of the United States House of Representatives from Vermont
Burials in Vermont
19th-century American politicians
State's attorneys in Vermont
19th-century American judges